Darren Walker (born August 28, 1959) currently serves as 10th president of the Ford Foundation, a private foundation dedicated to human welfare. In June 2020, Walker led the Ford Foundation to issue a $1 billion designated social bond to stabilize non-profit organizations in the wake of COVID-19 pandemic. Walker is a member of the Reimagining New York Commission and co-chair of 2020 New York City Census. In October 2021, Walker announced that the Ford Foundation will divest its investments from "fossil fuels and seek opportunities to invest in alternative and renewable energy in the future"; including investing in "funds that address the threat of climate change, and support the transition to a green economy."

Before joining the Ford Foundation, Walker was vice president at the Rockefeller Foundation and COO of Harlem's Abyssinian Development Corporation. He co-founded both the US Impact Investing Alliance and the Presidents' Council on Disability Inclusion in Philanthropy. He serves on many boards, including the National Gallery of Art, Carnegie Hall, the High Line, the Smithsonian National Museum of African American History & Culture, Committee to Protect Journalists, Square, PepsiCo, and Ralph Lauren. Walker chaired the 2013 Gish Prize selection committee.

Earlier in his career, Walker worked as a lawyer and investment banker. Walker is a fellow of the Institute for Urban Design, a member of the Council on Foreign Relations, and a board member of the Arcus Foundation, Rockefeller Philanthropy Advisors, Friends of the High Line, and the Foundation for Art and Preservation in Embassies. He has been a teacher of housing, law and urban development at the New York University School of Law and the Robert F. Wagner Graduate School of Public Service. He is co-chair of the New York Public Library Council. He is board of directors vice-chairman at the New York City Ballet. In 2018, Walker joined the board of directors of the Committee to Protect Journalists.

Early life and education

Walker was born in a charity hospital in Lafayette, Louisiana. Walker was raised by a single mother, Beulah Spencer, in Ames and later Goose Creek, Texas; and was one of the country's first children to benefit from the Head Start Program. Walker said that his background gave him "an understanding of the need for investment in human capital and the centrality of private philanthropy making a difference in human lives."

University of Texas
With financial support from a Pell Grant, Walker was admitted to the University of Texas at Austin. In 1982, he graduated with a Bachelor of Arts in Government and a Bachelor of Science in Speech Communication. Subsequently, in 1986, Walker graduated from the University of Texas School of Law.

Career
Walker began his career in 1986, at the international law firm Cleary, Gottlieb, Steen & Hamilton. In 1988, he joined Union Bank of Switzerland (UBS) and spent seven years in its capital markets division.

In 1995, Walker left the corporate world to spend a year volunteering at a school in Harlem. He went on to become the chief operating officer at Abyssinian Development Corporation, a community development organization also located in Harlem. There, he was able to draw on his private sector experience to advance redevelopment in Harlem, including the opening of a Pathmark supermarket in 1999 at 125th Street and Lexington Avenue. Also, Walker led the development of the first public school built in New York City by a community organization.

From 2002 to 2010, Walker was Vice President for Foundation Initiatives at the Rockefeller Foundation, where he oversaw a wide range of programs in the United States and internationally. Also, at the Rockefeller Foundation, he led recovery program in the South of the US after Hurricane Katrina.

He joined the Ford Foundation in 2010 as vice president for Education, Creativity and Free Expression, one of the foundation's three major program areas. He also oversaw the Ford Foundation's regional programming in four offices based in Africa and the Middle East. Amongst other achievements, as the Ford Foundation's vice president for Education, Creativity and Free Expression, Walker was a creative and servant leadership driving force behind initiatives such as JustFilms - one of the largest documentary film funds in the world - with the goal of advancing "social justice worldwide through the talent of emerging and established filmmakers"; as well as championing public-private collaborations such as ArtPlace, which supports cultural development in cities and rural areas in the United States. Walker was also instrumental to saving American Folk Art Museum from going under because of the museum's dire financial straits, declaring that the museum is "a powerful showcase of the American spirit and an important public treasure for the people of our city."

Rockefeller Foundation

On July 20, 2006, Judith Rodin, president of the Rockefeller Foundation announced that Walker would be the foundation's United States and international initiatives vice president. Rodin said: "Darren Walker's leadership has been critical to the Rockefeller Foundation's program strategy development, to advancing some of the Foundation's flagship programs, and, most recently, to our efforts to help break the planning logjam in New Orleans. We're energized by the opportunity to have Darren play a wider role in leading the Foundation." He took office on August 1, 2006.

At the Rockefeller Foundation, Walker led the foundation's work in the United States and globally - in terms of supporting innovations that built economic development, sustainability and assets of poor and disadvantaged people; while creating long-term strategies that addressed increasing global migration, movements and urbanization. He also oversaw the foundation's new strategy and vision for New York City, including directing the Rockefeller Foundation's dedicated service in support of the re-building of New Orleans.

Concerning Katrina, Walker reflected that:

On his appointment as vice president, Walker remarked:

Joining Mayor Michael Bloomberg, Walker led the Rockefeller Foundation to fund "a new Conditional Cash Transfer Learning Network which will share New York City's experience designing and implementing Opportunity NYC, the nation's first conditional cash transfer (CCT) program, as well as to continue learning from other countries and US cities about incentive-based poverty reduction programs." About the Network, Walker said: "As a global foundation, the Rockefeller Foundation has a keen interest in finding poverty-fighting models that work in different contexts around the world. The Foundation is proud to be a lead funder of Opportunity NYC, and we see the CCT learning network as an important means to further our investment in this groundbreaking pilot program."

Earlier, from 2002, Walker served as the Rockefeller Foundation's working communities program director; where he oversaw a grant making portfolio, in excess of USD$25 million per year, that created anti-poverty strategies focusing on education, employment, sustainable community development, and democracy building in the United States. Bearing his mind on Walker's hiring, Sir Gordon Richard Conway, then president of the Rockefeller Foundation, said:

Ford Foundation
Having been named president of the Ford Foundation in June 2013, Walker later assumed office in September 2013, succeeding Luis Ubiñas. In his earliest comments after becoming president of the Ford Foundation, Walker pledged to uphold the longstanding "advancement of human welfare" mission of the foundation, including its social justice and fairer world angle:

Also, at a meeting with Ford Foundation staff titled: "What should we help build next?", Walker said:

In a December 2013 interview by New America Media, Walker talked about his opportunity to make the United States a better country for Americans and humankind, globally through his servant leadership at the Ford Foundation:

To support climate action, earth's health, green economy plus renewable energy; and "to harness the full power of Ford Foundation's assets in the fight for a more just and fair world", Walker stated, in October 2021, that the Ford Foundation will divest investments from fossil fuels. Notably, Walker announced, as follows:

Under Walker's leadership, the Ford Foundation became the first non-profit organization to issue a $1 billion earmarked social bond in US capital markets for proceeds to strengthen and stabilize non-profit organizations affected by COVID-19.

Operation Detroit

Walker led efforts to save the Detroit Institute of Arts and city workers' pensions in the Detroit bankruptcy process. Walker stated that it was "unprecedented and monumental for philanthropies to undertake this kind of initiative, but if there was ever a time when philanthropy should step up, this is it." Of Detroit's $18 billion in debts, Walker's Ford Foundation pledged to provide $125 million, and either other foundations contributed a sum of $205 million. The contribution would relieve the city-owned Detroit Institute of the Arts from having to sell some of its collection.

The foundations explained their investments as an attempt to "bolster the spirit of positive engagement and creativity in Detroit."

Expanded learning time

With the National Center on Time & Learning and the governors of Colorado, Connecticut, Massachusetts, New York, and Tennessee, Walker and the Ford Foundation contribute to a public education initiative called TIME Collaborative. The initiative invests in expanded learning time.

Recognition 

The Wall Street Journal 2020 Philanthropy Innovator 
 Time magazine's annual 100 Most Influential People in 2016
 Rolling Stone 25 People Shaping the Future in 2017
 Fast Company Most Creative People in Business in 2017
 Ebony Power 100 in 2014
 Out magazine's Power 50 in 2015

In July 2022, he was awarded as Honorary Officer of the Order of the British Empire (OBE), for "services to US/UK relations".

Commencement speeches 
Walker has given commencement addresses for:

 The Miami Dade College medical campus in 2014
 University of Texas at Austin in 2015
 Hunter College, City University of New York in 2016
 New York University in 2016
 Queens College, City University of New York in 2016
 Oberlin College in 2017
 Sarah Lawrence College in 2018
 Hamilton College in 2018
 University of Vermont in 2019
 Amherst College in 2019
 Bennington College in 2021
 Prairie View A&M University in 2022

Personal life

Walker is openly gay. His partner of 26 years, David Beitzel, died in 2019 from heart failure.

References

External links
Ford Foundation profile
Leonardo DiCaprio Foundation 
High-Level Task Force: ICPD: International Conference on Population and Development 
Philanthropy News Digest 
Center on Philanthropy and Civil Society: Stanford University
Global Philanthropy Forum 
Talks at Goldman Sachs

1959 births
American chief operating officers
American humanitarians
American nonprofit executives
Gay men
LGBT African Americans
LGBT people from Louisiana
Living people
New York (state) lawyers
New York University faculty
People associated with Cleary Gottlieb Steen & Hamilton
University of Texas School of Law alumni
Members of the American Philosophical Society
Honorary Officers of the Order of the British Empire
21st-century American LGBT people